The linear no-threshold model (LNT) is a dose-response model used in radiation protection to estimate stochastic health effects such as radiation-induced cancer, genetic mutations and teratogenic effects on the human body due to exposure to ionizing radiation. The model statistically extrapolates effects of radiation from very high doses (where they are observable) into very low doses, where no biological effects may be observed. The LNT model lies at a foundation of a postulate that all exposure to ionizing radiation is harmful, regardless of how low the dose is, and that the effect is cumulative over lifetime.

The LNT model is commonly used by regulatory bodies as a basis for formulating public health policies that set regulatory dose limits to protect against the effects of radiation. The model has also been used in the assessment of cancer risks of mutagenic chemicals. The validity of the LNT model, however, is disputed, and other significant models exist: the threshold model, which assumes that very small exposures are harmless, the radiation hormesis model, which says that radiation at very small doses can be beneficial, and the supra-linear model based on observational data. Whenever the cancer risk is estimated from real data at low doses, and not from extrapolation of observations at high doses, the supra-linear model is verified. It has been argued that the LNT model may have created an irrational fear of radiation.

Different organizations take different approaches to the LNT model. For example, the US Nuclear Regulatory Commission and United States Environmental Protection Agency endorse the model, while a number of other bodies deprecate it. One of the organizations for establishing recommendations on radiation protection guidelines internationally, the United Nations Scientific Committee on the Effects of Atomic Radiation (UNSCEAR) that previously supported the LNT model, no longer supports the model for very low radiation doses.

Introduction 
Stochastic health effects are those that occur by chance, and whose probability is proportional to the dose, but whose severity is independent of the dose. The LNT model assumes there is no lower threshold at which stochastic effects start, and assumes a linear relationship between dose and the stochastic health risk. In other words, LNT assumes that radiation has the potential to cause harm at any dose level, however small, and the sum of several very small exposures is just as likely to cause a stochastic health effect as a single larger exposure of equal dose value. In contrast, deterministic health effects are radiation-induced effects such as acute radiation syndrome, which are caused by tissue damage. Deterministic effects reliably occur above a threshold dose and their severity increases with dose. Because of the inherent differences, LNT is not a model for deterministic effects, which are instead characterized by other types of dose-response relationships.

LNT is a common model to calculate the probability of radiation-induced cancer both at high doses where epidemiology studies support its application, but controversially, also at low doses, which is a dose region that has a lower predictive statistical confidence. Nonetheless, regulatory bodies, such as the Nuclear Regulatory Commission (NRC), commonly use LNT as a basis for regulatory dose limits to protect against stochastic health effects, as found in many public health policies. Whether the LNT model describes the reality for small-dose exposures is disputed, and challenges to the LNT model used by NRC for setting radiation protection regulations were submitted. NRC rejected the petitions in 2021 because "they fail to present an adequate basis supporting the request to discontinue use of the LNT model".

The LNT model opposes two competing schools of thought: the threshold model, which assumes that very small exposures are harmless, and the radiation hormesis model, which claims that radiation at very small doses can be beneficial. A 2016 peer-reviewed meta-analysis rejected the LNT on the basis of a lack of empirical evidence supporting it, and that it ignores biological effects, especially the self-correcting mechanisms in DNA which are effective up to a certain level of mutagenic agent. Because the current data is inconclusive, scientists disagree on which model should be used. Pending any definitive answer to these questions, the LNT model is applied through the precautionary principle. The model is sometimes used to quantify the cancerous effect of collective doses of low-level radioactive contaminations, which may produce estimates of excess deaths at levels that may have had zero deaths or saved lives in the two other models. Such practice has been criticized by the International Commission on Radiological Protection since 2007.

The LNT model is sometimes applied to other cancer hazards such as polychlorinated biphenyls in drinking water.

Origins

The association of exposure to radiation with cancer had been observed as early as 1902, six years after the discovery of X-rays by Wilhelm Röntgen and radioactivity by Henri Becquerel. In 1927, Hermann Muller demonstrated that radiation may cause genetic mutation. He also suggested mutation as a cause of cancer. Gilbert N. Lewis and Alex Olson, based on Muller's discovery of the effect of radiation on mutation, proposed a mechanism for biological evolution in 1928, suggesting that genomic mutation was induced by cosmic and terrestrial radiation and first introduced the idea that such mutation may occur proportionally to the dose of radiation. Various laboratories, including Muller's, then demonstrated the apparent linear dose response of mutation frequency. Muller, who received a Nobel Prize for his work on the mutagenic effect of radiation in 1946, asserted in his Nobel lecture, The Production of Mutation, that mutation frequency is "directly and simply proportional to the dose of irradiation applied" and that there is "no threshold dose".

The early studies were based on higher levels of radiation that made it hard to establish the safety of low level of radiation. Indeed, many early scientists believed that there may be a tolerance level, and that low doses of radiation may not be harmful. A later study in 1955 on mice exposed to low dose of radiation suggests that they may outlive control animals. The interest in the effects of radiation intensified after the dropping of atomic bombs on Hiroshima and Nagasaki, and studies were conducted on the survivors. Although compelling evidence on the effect of low dosage of radiation was hard to come by, by the late 1940s, the idea of LNT became more popular due to its mathematical simplicity. In 1954, the National Council on Radiation Protection and Measurements (NCRP) introduced the concept of maximum permissible dose. In 1958, the United Nations Scientific Committee on the Effects of Atomic Radiation (UNSCEAR) assessed the LNT model and a threshold model, but noted the difficulty in acquiring "reliable information about the correlation between small doses and their effects either in individuals or in large populations". The United States Congress Joint Committee on Atomic Energy (JCAE) similarly could not establish if there is a threshold or "safe" level for exposure; nevertheless, it introduced the concept of "As Low As Reasonably Achievable" (ALARA). ALARA would become a fundamental principle in radiation protection policy that implicitly accepts the validity of LNT. In 1959, the United States Federal Radiation Council (FRC) supported the concept of the LNT extrapolation down to the low dose region in its first report.

By the 1970s, the LNT model had become accepted as the standard in radiation protection practice by a number of bodies. In 1972, the first report of National Academy of Sciences (NAS) Biological Effects of Ionizing Radiation (BEIR), an expert panel who reviewed available peer reviewed literature, supported the LNT model on pragmatic grounds, noting that while "dose-effect relationship for x rays and gamma rays may not be a linear function", the "use of linear extrapolation . . . may be justified on pragmatic grounds as a basis for risk estimation." In its seventh report of 2006, NAS BEIR VII writes, "the committee concludes that the preponderance of information indicates that there will be some risk, even at low doses".

Radiation precautions and public policy

Radiation precautions have led to sunlight being listed as a carcinogen at all sun exposure rates, due to the ultraviolet component of sunlight, with no safe level of sunlight exposure being suggested, following the precautionary LNT model. According to a 2007 study submitted by the University of Ottawa to the Department of Health and Human Services in Washington, D.C., there is not enough information to determine a safe level of sun exposure.

If a particular dose of radiation is found to produce one extra case of a type of cancer in every thousand people exposed, LNT projects that one thousandth of this dose will produce one extra case in every million people so exposed, and that one millionth of the original dose will produce one extra case in every billion people exposed. The conclusion is that any given dose equivalent of radiation will produce the same number of cancers, no matter how thinly it is spread. This allows the summation by dosimeters of all radiation exposure, without taking into consideration dose levels or dose rates.

The model is simple to apply: a quantity of radiation can be translated into a number of deaths without any adjustment for the distribution of exposure, including the distribution of exposure within a single exposed individual. For example, a hot particle embedded in an organ (such as lung) results in a very high dose in the cells directly adjacent to the hot particle, but a much lower whole-organ and whole-body dose. Thus, even if a safe low dose threshold was found to exist at cellular level for radiation-induced mutagenesis, the threshold would not exist for environmental pollution with hot particles, and could not be safely assumed to exist when the distribution of dose is unknown.

The linear no-threshold model is used to extrapolate the expected number of extra deaths caused by exposure to environmental radiation, and it therefore has a great impact on public policy. The model is used to translate any radiation release, like that from a "dirty bomb", into a number of lives lost, while any reduction in radiation exposure, for example as a consequence of radon detection, is translated into a number of lives saved. When the doses are very low, at natural background levels, in the absence of evidence, the model predicts via extrapolation, new cancers only in a very small fraction of the population, but for a large population, the number of lives is extrapolated into hundreds or thousands, and this can sway public policy.

A linear model has long been used in health physics to set maximum acceptable radiation exposures.

The United States-based National Council on Radiation Protection and Measurements (NCRP), a body commissioned by the United States Congress, recently released a report written by the national experts in the field which states that radiation's effects should be considered to be proportional to the dose an individual receives, regardless of how small the dose is.

A 1958 analysis of two decades of research on the mutation rate of 1 million lab mice showed that six major hypotheses about ionizing radiation and gene mutation were not supported by data. Its data was used in 1972 by the Biological Effects of Ionizing Radiation I committee to support the LNT model. However, it has been claimed that the data contained a fundamental error that was not revealed to the committee, and would not support the LNT model on the issue of mutations and may suggest a threshold dose rate under which radiation does not produce any mutations.

Fieldwork
The LNT model and the alternatives to it each have plausible mechanisms that could bring them about, but definitive conclusions are hard to make given the difficulty of doing longitudinal studies involving large cohorts over long periods.

A 2003 review of the various studies published in the authoritative Proceedings of the National Academy of Sciences concludes that "given our current state of knowledge, the most reasonable assumption is that the cancer risks from low doses of x- or gamma-rays decrease linearly with decreasing dose."

A 2005 study of Ramsar, Iran (a region with very high levels of natural background radiation) showed that lung cancer incidence was lower in the high-radiation area than in seven surrounding regions with lower levels of natural background radiation. A fuller epidemiological study of the same region showed no difference in mortality for males, and a statistically insignificant increase for females.

A 2009 study by researchers that looks at Swedish children exposed to fallout from Chernobyl while they were fetuses between 8 and 25 weeks gestation concluded that the reduction in IQ at very low doses was greater than expected, given a simple LNT model for radiation damage, indicating that the LNT model may be too conservative when it comes to neurological damage. However, in medical journals, studies detail that in Sweden in the year of the Chernobyl accident, the birth rate both increased and shifted to those of "higher maternal age" in 1986. More advanced maternal age in Swedish mothers was linked with a reduction in offspring IQ in a paper published in 2013. Neurological damage has a different biology than cancer.

In a 2009 study, cancer rates among UK radiation workers were found to increase with higher recorded occupational radiation doses. The doses examined varied between 0 and 500 millisieverts (mSv) received over their working lives. These results exclude the possibilities of no increase in risk or that the risk is 2-3 times that for A-bomb survivors with a confidence level of 90%. The cancer risk for these radiation workers was still less than the average for persons in the UK due to the healthy worker effect.

A 2009 study focusing on the naturally high background radiation region of Karunagappalli, India concluded: "our cancer incidence study, together with previously reported cancer mortality studies in the HBR area of Yangjiang, China, suggests it is unlikely that estimates of risk at low doses are substantially greater than currently believed." A 2011 meta-analysis further concluded that the "Total whole body radiation doses received over 70 years from the natural environment high background radiation areas in Kerala, India and Yanjiang, China are much smaller than [the non-tumour dose, "defined as the highest dose of radiation at which no statistically significant tumour increase was observed above the control level"] for the respective dose-rates in each district."

In 2011 an in vitro time-lapse study of the cellular response to low doses of radiation showed a strongly non-linear response of certain cellular repair mechanisms called radiation-induced foci (RIF). The study found that low doses of radiation prompted higher rates of RIF formation than high doses, and that after low-dose exposure RIF continued to form after the radiation had ended.

In 2012 a historical cohort study of over 175,000 patients without previous cancer who were examined with CT head scans in UK between 1985 and 2002 was published. The study, which investigated leukaemia and brain cancer, indicated a linear dose response in the low dose region and had qualitative estimates of risk that were in agreement with the Life Span Study (Epidemiology data for low-linear energy transfer radiation).

In 2013 a data linkage study of 11 million Australians with over 680,000 people exposed to CT scans between 1985 and 2005 was published. The study confirmed the results of the 2012 UK study for leukaemia and brain cancer but also investigated other cancer types. The authors conclude that their results were generally consistent with the linear no threshold model.

However, these were disputed by a 2014 French study of 67,274 patients that took into account cancer-predisposing factors among those scanned. It concluded that taking these factors into account, there is no significant excess risk from CT scans.

In 2016 Jeffry A. Siegel summarised the debate between supporters and opponents of LNT as based partially in conflict between statistical and experimental inference:

A 2021 study based on whole-genome sequencing of children of parents employed as liquidators in Chernobyl indicated no trans-generational genetic effects of exposure of parents to ionizing radiation.

Controversy
The LNT model has been contested by a number of scientists. It has been claimed that the early proponent of the model Hermann Joseph Muller intentionally ignored an early study that did not support the LNT model when he gave his 1946 Nobel Prize address advocating the model.

In very high dose radiation therapy, it was known at the time that radiation can cause a physiological increase in the rate of pregnancy anomalies; however, human exposure data and animal testing suggests that the "malformation of organs appears to be a deterministic effect with a threshold dose", below which no rate increase is observed. A review in 1999 on the link between the Chernobyl accident and teratology (birth defects) concludes that "there is no substantive proof regarding radiation‐induced teratogenic effects from the Chernobyl accident". It is argued that the human body has defense mechanisms, such as DNA repair and programmed cell death, that would protect it against carcinogenesis due to low-dose exposures of carcinogens.

Ramsar, located in Iran, is often quoted as being a counter example to LNT. Based on preliminary results, it was considered as having the highest natural background radiation levels on Earth, several times higher than the ICRP-recommended radiation dose limits for radiation workers, whilst the local population did not seem to have any ill effects. However, the population of the high-radiation districts is small (about 1800 inhabitants) and only receive an average of 6 millisieverts per year, so cancer epidemiology data are too imprecise to draw any conclusions. On the other hand, there may be non-cancer effects from the background radiation such as chromosomal aberrations.

At the same time in Germany and Austria, some of the most radiophobic countries, people attend "radon spas" where they voluntarily expose themselves to low-level radiation of radon  for its alleged health benefits.

A 2011 research of the cellular repair mechanisms support the evidence against the linear no-threshold model. According to its authors, this study published in the Proceedings of the National Academy of Sciences of the United States of America "casts considerable doubt on the general assumption that risk to ionizing radiation is proportional to dose".

A 2011 review of studies addressing childhood leukaemia following exposure to ionizing radiation, including both diagnostic exposure and natural background exposure from radon, concluded that existing risk factors, excess relative risk per sievert (ERR/Sv), is "broadly applicable" to low dose or low dose-rate exposure, "although the uncertainties associated with this estimate are considerable". The study also notes that "epidemiological studies have been unable, in general, to detect the influence of natural background radiation upon the risk of childhood leukaemia"

Several expert scientific panels have been convened on the accuracy of the LNT model at low dosage, and various organizations and bodies have stated their positions on this topic:
 Support
 The US Nuclear Regulatory Commission:
 The NRC upheld the LNT model in 2021 as a "sound regulatory basis for minimizing the risk of unnecessary radiation exposure to both members of the public and radiation workers" following challenges to the dose limit requirements contained in its regulations.
 In 2004 the United States National Research Council (part of the National Academy of Sciences) supported the linear no threshold model and stated regarding Radiation hormesis:
 In 2005 the United States National Academies' National Research Council published its comprehensive meta-analysis of low-dose radiation research BEIR VII, Phase 2. In its press release the Academies stated:

 The National Council on Radiation Protection and Measurements (a body commissioned by the United States Congress). endorsed the LNT model in a 2001 report that attempted to survey existing literature critical of the model.
 The United States Environmental Protection Agency endorses the LNT model in its 2011 report on radiogenic cancer risk:
UNSCEAR notably reversed its earlier support on the LNT model in 2014 for doses at levels equivalent to or lower than natural background levels (see below).
Oppose
A number of organisations disagree with using the Linear no-threshold model to estimate risk from environmental and occupational low-level radiation exposure:

 The French Academy of Sciences (Académie des Sciences) and the National Academy of Medicine (Académie Nationale de Médecine) published a report in 2005 (at the same time as BEIR VII report in the United States) that rejected the linear no-threshold model in favor of a threshold dose response and a significantly reduced risk at low radiation exposure:

 The Health Physics Society's position statement first adopted in January 1996, last revised in February 2019, states:

The Health Physics Society (in the United States) has published a documentary series on the origins of the LNT model.

 The American Nuclear Society concurred with the Health Physics Society's position that:   
 However, it recommended further research on the Linear No Threshold Hypothesis before making adjustments to current radiation protection guidelines derived from the LNT model.

UNSCEAR, which supported the LNT model in its previous reports on radiogenic cancer risk, has adjusted its position in its 2012 report and stated:

Mental health effects

It has been argued that the LNT model had caused an irrational fear of radiation, whose observable effects are much more significant than non-observable effects postulated by LNT. In the wake of the 1986 Chernobyl accident in Ukraine, Europe-wide anxieties were fomented in pregnant mothers over the perception enforced by the LNT model that their children would be born with a higher rate of mutations. As far afield as the country of Switzerland, hundreds of excess induced abortions were performed on the healthy unborn, out of this no-threshold fear. Following the accident however, studies of data sets approaching a million births in the EUROCAT database, divided into "exposed" and control groups were assessed in 1999. As no Chernobyl impacts were detected, the researchers conclude "in retrospect the widespread fear in the population about the possible effects of exposure on the unborn was not justified". Despite studies from Germany and Turkey, the only robust evidence of negative pregnancy outcomes that transpired after the accident were these elective abortion indirect effects, in Greece, Denmark, Italy etc., due to the anxieties created.

The consequences of low-level radiation are often more psychological than radiological. Because damage from very-low-level radiation cannot be detected, people exposed to it are left in anguished uncertainty about what will happen to them. Many believe they have been fundamentally contaminated for life and may refuse to have children for fear of birth defects. They may be shunned by others in their community who fear a sort of mysterious contagion.

Forced evacuation from a radiation or nuclear accident may lead to social isolation, anxiety, depression, psychosomatic medical problems, reckless behavior, or suicide. Such was the outcome of the 1986 Chernobyl nuclear disaster in Ukraine. A comprehensive 2005 study concluded that "the mental health impact of Chernobyl is the largest public health problem unleashed by the accident to date". Frank N. von Hippel, a U.S. scientist, commented on the 2011 Fukushima nuclear disaster, saying that "fear of ionizing radiation could have long-term psychological effects on a large portion of the population in the contaminated areas".

Such great psychological danger does not accompany other materials that put people at risk of cancer and other deadly illness. Visceral fear is not widely aroused by, for example, the daily emissions from coal burning, although as a National Academy of Sciences study found, this causes 10,000 premature deaths a year in the US. It is "only nuclear radiation that bears a huge psychological burden – for it carries a unique historical legacy".

See also 
 DNA repair
 Dose fractionation
 Nuclear power debate#Health effects on population near nuclear power plants and workers
 Radiology
 Radiotherapy
 Inge Schmitz-Feuerhake
 Biphasic Model, a fringe theory that low dose radiation is generally more harmful than higher doses.

References

External links 
ICRP, International Commission on Radiation Protection
ICRU, International Commission on Radiation Units
IAEA, International Atomic Agency Energy Agency
UNSCEAR, United Nations Scientific Committee on the effects of Ionizing Radiations
IARC, International Agency for Research on Cancer
HPA (ex NCRP), Health Protection Agency, UK
IRPA, International Radiation Protection Association
NCRP, National Council on Radiation Protection and Measurements, USA
IRSN, Institute for Radioprotection and Nuclear Safety, France
 Report from the European Committee on Radiation Risk broadly supporting the Linear No Threshold model 
 ECRR report on Chernobyl (April 2006) claiming deliberate suppression of the LNT in public health studies
 BBC article discussing doubts over LNT
 How dangerous is ionising radiation? Reprinted "Powerpoint" notes from a colloquium at the Physics Department, Oxford University, 24 November 2006
 International Dose-Response Society – dedicated to the enhancement, exchange, and dissemination of ongoing global research in hormesis, a dose-response phenomenon characterized by low-dose stimulation and high-dose inhibition.
 

Radiation health effects
Radiobiology
Nuclear medicine
Oncology
Medical controversies
Radiation protection